The Denmark Women's Volleyball League is a Women's volleyball competition organized by the Dansk Volleyball Forbund (DVF), it was created in 1962.

History 
The Danish Women's Volleyball League is the Women's topflight League in Danish volleyball Organized since 1962. 
The competition is dominated Largely by Holte IF having won a total of 18 titles seven of them consecutively between (1993–1999), while Helsingør KFUM from Helsingør comes second with nine consecutive titles won between (1979—1987). 
2021/22 League was played in a regular season mode then teams are qualified for a title deciding Playoffs.

List of Champions

Table by Club

References

External links
Danish Volleyball Federation 
  Danish VolleyLigaen. women.volleybox.net 

Denmark
Sports leagues established in 1962
1962 establishments in Denmark
Volleyball in Denmark 
Denmark League
Professional sports leagues in Denmark